John Carroll Kirby is an American pianist, record producer and composer based in Los Angeles, California, United States. As a musician, Kirby has collaborated with artists including Solange, Frank Ocean, Miley Cyrus, Norah Jones, Bat for Lashes, Connan Mockasin, Sébastien Tellier, Harry Styles, and others.

Career

2007-17: Early years, collaborations, Grammy Awards
Growing up in California, Kirby was encouraged by his mom to take piano lessons, which led to a lengthy immersion in jazz. He studied jazz orchestration and composing with John Clayton at the University of Southern California before touring with other artists and making a name for himself as a collaborator. In 2007, Kirby contributed to will.i.am's Songs About Girls, Jully Black's Revival, and Raya Yarbrough's self-titled LP before going on to work on albums by Mike Doughty, Norah Jones, David Holmes, and Madeleine Peyroux. In the same year, Kirby was credited with electric piano on a few tracks for Sébastien Tellier and went on to co-arrange and co-produce Sébastien Betbeder's Marie et les Naufragés. In 2015, Kirby partnered with Cara Stricker under the alias, Drool, for a self-titled album of moody avant-pop released by Terrible Records. Shortly after, Kirby was on keys for Blood Orange's Freetown Sound, and co-produced three tracks on Solange's Billboard 200-topping A Seat at the Table, where he also played synths on "Cranes in the Sky", the track which earned Solange her first Grammy for Best R&B Performance at the 59th Grammy Awards in 2016. After collaborations with INGA, Sébastien Tellier, Midnight Juggernauts' Daniel Stricker and Shabazz Palaces, Kirby issued his first solo album, Travel, on OUTSIDE INSIGHT and Meditations in Music on Leaving Records in 2017. He was also extensively involved in Boys Like Girls' Martin Johnson's side project The Night Game's self-titled album that year.

2019-present: Collaborations, studio albums 
In 2019, Kirby was featured on Solange's When I Get Home, Bat for Lashes' Lost Girls, Mark Ronson's Late Night Feelings, as well as Frank Ocean's "DHL" and Harry Styles' "Canyon Moon." In the same year, he signed to Stones Throw Records and issued "Lazzara" before releasing Tuscany, on Patience. The following year, Kirby played on The Avalanches' Blood Orange collaboration "We Will Always Love You" before releasing Conflict, an ambient album created in response to the COVID-19 pandemic, on Stones Throw. Shortly after, he debuted his full-length album, My Garden, on the label. Pitchfork described Kirby as a musician who "crafts melodies with a neat geometric precision".

In April 2021, Kirby announced his second studio album for Stones Throw Records, Septet. An electronic jazz album, Septet was made with a live seven-piece band and was released on June 2, 2021. The music video for the album's first single, "Rainmaker", features musicians from Kirby's ensemble, along with special guests Mac DeMarco, Eddie Chacon, Cola Boyy and comedian Kerwin Frost. Kirby also wrote and produced the original soundtrack to the animated film Cryptozoo, which won the Innovator Award at the 2021 Sundance Film Festival. The original soundtrack was released separately by Stones Throw Records in August 2021. That same year,My Garden was nominated for Best Jazz Album for the 2021 A2IM Libera Awards. He also worked closely with American singer-songwriter Kacy Hill for her album, Simple, Sweet, and Smiling, which Paper said drew "on the magnetic ambiance of Kirby's music".

In March 2022, Kirby announced his new album Dance Ancestral with the first single "Dawn of New Day" featuring ambient pioneer Laraaji. The track was included in Uncut'''s "The 2nd Uncut New Music Playlist Of 2022". Dance Ancestral'' was made in collaboration with Canadian artist Yu Su and was released on Stones Throw Records on 8 April, 2022.

Discography

Albums

Singles

Collaborations

References

External links
 

Living people
Musicians from Los Angeles
American record producers
American artists
Stones Throw Records artists
Year of birth missing (living people)